The Barber of Siberia (translit. Sibirskiy tsiryulnik) is a 1998 Russian film that re-united the Academy Award-winning team of director Nikita Mikhalkov and producer Michel Seydoux. It was screened out of competition at the 1999 Cannes Film Festival. The film was selected as the Russian entry for the Best Foreign Language Film at the 71st Academy Awards, but was disqualified for not getting a print lately to Los Angeles as a nominee.

Plot
Jane Callahan (Julia Ormond), a beautiful American lady, writes to her son, a cadet at a famous military academy, about a long kept secret. Twenty years ago she arrived in Russia to assist Douglas McCracken (Richard Harris), an obsessive engineer who needs the Grand Duke Alexei Alexandrovich's patronage to sponsor his invention, a massive machine to harvest the Siberian forests. On her travels, she meets two men who would change her life forever: a handsome young cadet Andrej Tolstoy (Oleg Menshikov) with whom she shares a fondness for opera, and the powerful General Radlov who is entranced by her beauty and wants to marry her. Tolstoy and Radlov, much to the surprise and indignation of the latter, become rivals for Jane's love. She confides a deep secret to Tolstoy, promises to marry him, and together they spend a passionate night of love fathering her child. But later he overhears Jane denying her interest in him to the General, in order to win the general's favour and be granted an audience with the Grand Duke. Distraught, Tolstoy attacks the General who arrests his young rival on false charges and banishes him to Siberia to seven years of hard labor and a further five years of exile.

Cast
 Julia Ormond – Jane Callahan-McCracken
 Richard Harris – Douglas McCracken
 Oleg Menshikov – Andrei Tolstoi / Andrew McCracken
 Aleksei Petrenko – General Radlov
 Marina Neyolova – Andrei Tolstoi's mother
 Vladimir Ilyin  – Captain Mokin
 Daniel Olbrychski – Kopnovsky
 Anna Mikhalkova – Dunyasha
 Marat Basharov – Cadet Polievskyy
 Nikita Tatarenkov – Cadet Alibekov
 Artyom Mikhalkov – Cadet Buturlin
 Georgiy Dronov – Cadet Nazarov 
 Avangard Leontyev – Andrei's uncle
 Robert Hardy – Forsten
 Elizabeth Spriggs – the countess Perepyolkina
 Nikita Mikhalkov – Tsar Alexander III

Music
 Chopin – Nocturne in D-flat major, Op. 27, No. 2. Jane plays the piece while General Radlov proposes to her.
 Mozart – Piano Concerto No. 23 in A major, K. 488 II Adagio. This is the movement that Jane's son plays to convince his drill sergeant that "Mozart was a great composer".

See also

 List of submissions to the 71st Academy Awards for Best Foreign Language Film
 List of Russian submissions for the Academy Award for Best Foreign Language Film

References

External links
 

 Trailer and Screenshots
 The Barber of Siberia stirs controversy Sergei Blagov, Asia Times, 17 April 1999.
 

1998 films
1990s historical comedy-drama films
Russian historical comedy-drama films
Films set in 1885
Films set in 1895
Films set in 1905
Films set in Moscow
Films set in the Russian Empire
Films set in Siberia
Films set in the United States
Films shot in the Czech Republic
Films shot in Moscow
Films shot in Nizhny Novgorod
Films shot in Siberia
Films shot in Portugal
1990s Russian-language films
English-language Russian films
1990s English-language films
Films directed by Nikita Mikhalkov
Films scored by Eduard Artemyev
French historical comedy-drama films
English-language French films
English-language Italian films
English-language Czech films
Russian multilingual films
Czech multilingual films
Italian historical comedy-drama films
Czech historical comedy-drama films
French multilingual films
American multilingual films
Italian multilingual films
1998 multilingual films
Films produced by Michel Seydoux
Films with screenplays by Nikita Mikhalkov
Russian-language Czech films
1990s French films